The Bosnia and Herzegovina men's national tennis team represents Bosnia and Herzegovina in Davis Cup tennis competition and is governed by the Tennis Association of Bosnia and Herzegovina.

Bosnia and Herzegovina currently plays in the Davis Cup World Group I. Before that they played in Group II and lost in the promotion round three times: 2010, 2011, 2013. In February 2019 they made their debut in the Davis Cup World Group I.

History
Bosnia and Herzegovina competed in its first Davis Cup in 1996.  Bosnian players previously represented Yugoslavia.

Notable former players that represented Bosnia in the Davis Cup include Amer Delić and Ivan Dodig, the latter of whom played for his hometown country of Bosnia up until 2006.

Current Team
Player information and rankings

Reserve/Injured Players

INJ Unable to play due to injury.
RES Reserve player.

Results and schedule

1996–1999

2000–2009

2010–2019

2020–

See also
Davis Cup
Bosnia and Herzegovina Fed Cup team

References

External links

Davis Cup teams
Davis Cup
Davis Cup